Caribachlamys sentis, the sentis scallop, is a species of bivalve mollusc in the family Pectinidae. It can be found in Caribbean waters, ranging from southern Florida to the West Indies and Brazil.

References

Pectinidae
Bivalves described in 1853